United States has competed at the World Athletics Relays since first edition held in 2014, and until edition held in 2019, Americans athletes have won a total of 31 medals, 22 of them gold. They have won the Golden Baton at all those editions.

Medals

Americans have won 9 titles in the men's field, 10 in the women's field and 3 in the mixed field.

Multiple wins athletes with three titles are Tony McQuay (4x400m 2014/2015/2017), LaShawn Merritt USA Men's 4x400m 2014/2015/2017), David Verburg USA Men's 4x400m 2014/2015/2017) among men and Natasha Hastings USA Women's 4x400m 2014/2015/2017), Chanelle Price (4x800m 2014/2015/2017), Sanya Richards-Ross (4x400m 2014/2015, Distance Medley Relay 2015) among women.

Details

Nassau 2014

Nassau 2015

Nassau 2017

Yokohama 2019

See also
United States national track and field team

References

External links
World Athletics Relays at World Athletics

 
Nations at the World Athletics Relays
Track and field in the United States